(born 6 January 1981) is a Belgian actor. His film debut was in the critically praised  (1996), directed by the Dardenne brothers. The latter was also directed by the  brothers. He portrayed French singer  in the 2012 film My Way, for which he was nominated for a César Award for Best Actor, and Yves Saint Laurent co-founder Pierre Bergé in the 2014 biopic Saint Laurent, which earned him a César Award nomination for Best Supporting Actor.

Filmography

Awards and nominations

References

External links

  
 

1981 births
Living people
Magritte Award winners
Belgian male film actors
Belgian male television actors
20th-century Belgian male actors
21st-century Belgian male actors
Male actors from Brussels